Marfino is a rural locality (a village) in Novlenskoye Rural Settlement, Vologodsky District, Vologda Oblast, Russia. The population was 298 as of 2002. There are 18 streets.

Geography 
Marfino is located 14 km northwest of Vologda (the district's administrative centre) by road. Semyonkovo is the nearest rural locality.

References 

Rural localities in Vologodsky District